"Xeethra" is a short story by American author Clark Ashton Smith as part of his Zothique cycle, and first published in the December 1934 issue of Weird Tales.

Background
When editing the 1970 Smith collection Zothique, Lin Carter placed "Xeethra" as chronologically "the true beginning of events."

Plot
In pastoral Cincor, the young Xeethra wanders his goat herd to an unknown plain. Despite it being late in the day, Xeethra decides to explore. Finding a cave, he follows it through a tunnel to a hidden valley. There he finds a weird field with unusual flora and two giants guarding it. Amid the flora, Xeethra takes a bite of strange fruit and realises he was long ago King Amero of the far-off Calyz. Returning to his guardian Pornos, he admits this realisation while admitting he strayed too far and quite late. While Pornos refutes this thought, he admits there are certain passageways to the underworld of Thassaidon, an evil god. The next day, Xeethra begins his journey to find his lost kingdom. Eventually stumbling across ancient ruins, he discovers the lepers amid the decay. The lepers tell him about the lost kingdom Calyz which passed ages ago. Wrought with grief and gazing at the star Canopus, the evil god Thassaidon shows himself to Xeethra. Offering a deal for his soul in return to living out the heyday of Calyz, Xeethra takes it up and relives that lost age as King Amero. While enjoyable at first, King Amero finds disaster ravages Calyz and grows weary of rule. Instead, he takes up entertainers as distraction. One musician plays a song about a far-off land called Cincor that is less traveled and more serene. Enamoured with this story, King Amero asks for passage to this land. Thus the cycle of story is closed as King Amero relives his life as Xeethra.

Reception
In the 1981 book Twentieth-Century Science-Fiction Writers, Will Murray called it a "poignant story."

See also 
Clark Ashton Smith bibliography

References

External links

Text of "Xeethra"

Short stories by Clark Ashton Smith
Fantasy short stories
1934 short stories
Works originally published in Weird Tales